The New Girlfriend is a 2014 French erotic drama film written and directed by François Ozon, based on the short story of the same name by Ruth Rendell. It had its world premiere at the Toronto International Film Festival on 6 September 2014.

Cast
 Romain Duris as David / Virginia
 Anaïs Demoustier as Claire
 Raphaël Personnaz as Gilles
 Isild Le Besco as Laura
 Aurore Clément as Liz
 Jean-Claude Bolle-Reddat as Robert
 Bruno Perard as Eva Carlton
 Claudine Chatel as nanny
 Anita Gillier as nurse
 Alex Fondja as caregiver
 Zita Hanrot as restaurant waitress

Release
The New Girlfriend premiered at the 2014 Toronto International Film Festival on 6 September. The film was later screened at the San Sebastián Film Festival on 20 September 2014, where it won the Sebastiane Award. The jury commented, "[Ozon] calls into question the labels and roles of masculinity and femininity" and the jury "appreciates the contribution of this film to move towards a personal liberation, that could reaffirm the identity of every person". The film was also presented at the Zurich Film Festival on 2 October and the London Film Festival on 11 October. It was released theatrically in France on 5 November 2014 by Mars Distribution and in the United States on 18 September 2015 by Cohen Media Group.

Critical response
Review aggregation website Rotten Tomatoes gives the film a score of 80% based on 84 reviews, with an average score of 6.8 out of 10. The website's critics consensus reads, "While flirting with camp, François Ozon's The New Girlfriend offers thoughtful – and humorous – commentary on sexual and gender identity." On Metacritic, the film has a score of 74 out of 100 from 22 critics, indicating "generally favorable reviews".

Writing for The Hollywood Reporter, David Rooney expressed his compliments on The New Girlfriend: "a delectable riff on transformation, desire and sexuality that blends the heightened reality of melodrama with mischievous humor and an understated strain of Hitchcockian suspense". At Variety, Justin Chang said, "even as [Ozon] heads down any number of tantalizing if borderline-nonsensical alleyways, Ozon maintains his diabolical wit, his infectious sense of play and his essential affection for his characters" and the film was "powered by beautifully controlled performances from Anaïs Demoustier and Romain Duris".

Soundtrack

The soundtrack of The New Girlfriend was released on November 3, 2014. The song "Hot n Cold" by Katy Perry is played in the film but it is not available in the official soundtrack.

Accolades

References

External links
 
 

2014 drama films
2014 LGBT-related films
2010s erotic drama films
2010s French-language films
Cross-dressing in film
Films about gender
Films based on short fiction
Films directed by François Ozon
French erotic drama films
French LGBT-related films
LGBT-related drama films
Transgender-related films
2010s French films